Jordan Peters (born December 12, 1998) is a Canadian curler from Rosenort, Manitoba. He currently plays third on Team Jacques Gauthier.

Career
Peters first represented Manitoba at the 2017 Canadian U18 Curling Championships as third for Brett Walter. There, they finished in tenth place out of twelve teams with a 3–5 record. He won his first Manitoba junior title in 2019 with skip J. T. Ryan, sending the team to the 2019 Canadian Junior Curling Championships. At the championship, they finished round robin and championship pool play with a 7–3 record, qualifying for the playoffs. They defeated Saskatchewan's Rylan Kleiter in the semifinal before losing to British Columbia's Tyler Tardi in the final.

Peters joined the Jacques Gauthier rink at third for the 2019–20 season with Brayden Payette at second and Zack Bilawka at lead. The team lost in the final of the 2020 Manitoba Junior Provincials to Peters' former skip Walter but still got to compete at the 2020 Canadian Junior Curling Championships, representing the second Manitoba team as Nunavut and Yukon did not send teams. The team finished the round robin and championship pool with a 9–1 record which qualified them for the final. The team curled 92% which led them to a 8–6 victory over Newfoundland and Labrador's Daniel Bruce. At the 2020 World Junior Curling Championships, the team finished the round robin in second with a 7–2 record. In the playoffs, they defeated Germany in the semifinal and Switzerland in the final to claim the gold medal.

On June 17, 2022, Peters announced his new teammates for the following season, Andrew Clapham, Zack Bilawka and, Cole Chandler for the 2022-23 season.

Personal life
Peters graduated as a business student at the Providence University College and Theological Seminary.
Peters is from a family of 6, with 2 younger brothers and 1 sister.

Peters is an outspoken lifelong supporter of the Green Bay Packers of the NFL.

Teams

References

External links
 

1998 births
Living people
Canadian male curlers
Curlers from Manitoba
People from Morris, Manitoba
Sportspeople from Winkler, Manitoba